Lockyer is a rural locality in the Lockyer Valley Region, Queensland, Australia.

Geography

Lockyer railway station is an abandoned station on the Main Line railway.

History 
Jagara (also known as Jagera, Yagara, Yugarabul, Yuggera and Yuggerabul) is one of the Aboriginal languages of South-East Queensland. There is some uncertainty over the status of Jagara as a language, dialect or perhaps a group or clan within the local government boundaries of Ipswich City Council, Lockyer Regional Council and the Somerset Regional Council.

The locality takes its name from Lockyer Creek, believed to have been named by explorer Allan Cunningham in July 1829. It was named after Major Edmund Lockyer who explored the Brisbane River in 1825.

Lockyer Creek Provisional School opened circa 1891, being renamed Lockyer Provisional School in 1892. It closed on 1915.

Lockyer Upper State School (also known as Upper Lockyer State School) opened on 3 July 1939. It closed on 27 September 1968. It was on the western side of Murphys Creek Road at the junction with Lockyer Siding Road. Despite the name, it is now within the locality boundaries of Lockyer.

Heritage listings 
Lockyer has a number of heritage-listed sites, including:
 Toowoomba – Helidon Line: Lockyer Creek Railway Bridge (Lockyer)

References

Lockyer Valley Region
Localities in Queensland